Pardosa is a wolf spider species in the genus Pardosa, first described in 1879 and found in Hungary.

See also 
 List of Lycosidae species

References 

poecila
Spiders of Europe
Spiders described in 1879